Sulayman Jallow (born 30 November 1996) is a Gambian footballer who plays as a forward for Italian  club Viterbese.

Club career
He made his Serie C debut for Viterbese on 5 February 2017 in a game against Prato.

On 31 January 2020, he signed with Serie D club Milano City.

On 31 January 2023, Jallow returned to Viterbese.

References

External links
 
 

1996 births
Living people
Gambian footballers
Association football forwards
Serie B players
Serie C players
Serie D players
Ascoli Calcio 1898 F.C. players
U.S. Viterbese 1908 players
A.S. Gubbio 1910 players
A.C. Cuneo 1905 players
Milano City F.C. players
Montevarchi Calcio Aquila 1902 players
Gambian expatriate footballers
Gambian expatriate sportspeople in Italy
Expatriate footballers in Italy